The 1985 Bordeaux Open also known as the Nabisco Grand Prix Passing Shot was a men's tennis tournament played on clay courts at Villa Primrose in Bordeaux, France that was part of the 1985 Nabisco Grand Prix circuit. It was the seventh edition of the tournament and took place from 16 September until 20 September 1985. Fifth-seeded Diego Pérez won the singles title.

Finals

Singles
 Diego Pérez defeated  Jimmy Brown 6–4, 7–6
 It was Pérez' only singles title of his career.

Doubles
 David Felgate /  Steve Shaw defeated  Libor Pimek /  Blaine Willenborg 6–4, 5–7,
6–4

References

External links
 ITF tournament edition details

Bordeaux Open
ATP Bordeaux
Bordeaux Open
Bordeaux Open